National Tertiary Route 937, or just Route 937 (or ) is a National Road Route of Costa Rica, located in the Guanacaste province.

Description
In Guanacaste province the route covers La Cruz canton (Santa Elena district).

References

Highways in Costa Rica